Micro injection molding is a molding process for the manufacture of plastics components for shot weights of 1 to 0.1 grams with tolerances in the range of 10 to 100 microns. This molding process permits the manufacture of complicated small geometries with maximum possible accuracy and precision.

Basic concept
The basic concept of the micro injection molding process is quite similar to the regular injection moulding process. In this process, a micro injection unit is integrated in the injection moulding machine. When it comes to the production of micro components the machine and process technology mainly depend on the below points:
Short dwell time	
Low shear stress on the polymer melt
Homogeneous material preparation before molding
Precision injection and ejection
Accuracy of dimensions

Critical factors

Parting line issue 
A parting line (PL) is the line of separation on the part where the two halves of the mold meet. The parting line matching for micro parts is a big issue. The interlocking features of mold cavity and core for precise mating are used to reduce such issues.

Degating issue 
Another major critical factor of micro injection technology is that the smaller part size causes problems with degating (gate removal).

Sprue and runner size 

Runner and sprue diameters are another concern. The total volume of the feed system (sprue, runners and gates) can exceed the volume of the parts by a factor of 100 or more.

Materials and applications for micro injection molding
The most common polymers used in micro injection molding are reported in below table

Machine used for micro injection molding
In the 1980s, micro injection molding techniques utilized traditional injection molding, but no dedicated machines were available until the mid-1990s. Currently, commercial micro molding systems are produced from Milacron, Arburg and Sumitomo Demag as micro injection units for regular machines. At the same time, Wittmann Battenfeld, Babyplast and Desma are manufacturers of dedicated micro injection moulding machines.

Milacron developed two types of micro injection units: 
A two-stage and all-electric injection unit accomplished by an extruder and injection plunger 
An all-electric injection unit with 14 mm screw to inject the polymer melt into the mold

Arburg’ developed a micro injection molding machine with an 8 mm injection to ensure high degree of dosing precision. This type of machine is combined with a second screw, which is responsible for melting and homogenous mixing of the material.

Sumitomo Demag developed a customized micro molding injection unit suitable for micro parts weighing of 5 g to 0.1 g.

Market prospects
The miniaturization of automotive, medical, electronics, telecommunications devices is driving the need for micro molding of smaller components. The global polymer and thermoplastic micro moulding market covering medical, automotive, electronics and telecommunications was valued at $308m in 2012. Business growth of this technology is expected to continue and researchers have predicted that the value of micro injection molding will reach $763.6m by 2019 and $897.3m by 2020.

See also
 Molding (process)
 Direct injection expanded foam molding
 Fusible core injection molding
 Metal injection molding
 Multi-material injection molding
 Reaction injection molding
 Gas-assisted injection molding

References 

Injection molding